Dawood refers to the figure of David in Islam, the second king of the united Kingdom of Israel according to the Hebrew Bible.

Dawood may also refer to:

 Dawood (name), a common male given name and surname
 DaWood, David Dawood (born 1981), English DJ, producer and songwriter
 Dawood Group, a leading Pakistani holding company
 Dawood Public School, a famous educational institution in Bangladesh

See also
 Daoud (disambiguation)
 Daud (disambiguation)
 Dawoud
 Dawud (disambiguation)
 Dagwood (disambiguation)
 David (name)